Helleborus viridis, commonly called green hellebore, is a species of flowering plant in the buttercup family Ranunculaceae, native to Central and Western Europe, including southern England. All parts of the plant are poisonous.

It was one of many plants first described by Linnaeus in volume one of the 1753 (tenth) edition of his Species Plantarum. The Latin species epithet viridis means "green".

Two subspecies are recognised:
Helleborus viridis subsp. viridis from Central Europe and the maritime Alps
Helleborus viridis subsp. occidentalis from western Europe including the British Isles.

Other common names recorded include bastard hellebore, bear's foot and boar's foot.

The flowers appear in spring (February to April). They have five large green oval sepals with pointed tips, and seven to twelve much smaller petals. The roots are rhizomatous. Subspecies viridis has flowers of  diameter and leaves covered with fine hairs, while the flowers of subspecies occidentalis are smaller (3–4 cm diameter) and its leaves are smooth.
 
The green hellebore is found in Western and Central Europe, east to eastern Austria and south to northern Italy. It grows on limestone and chalk-based soils in the south of England.

It has become invasive in North America, Scandinavia, the Netherlands, and northern Germany.

Consumption of any part of the plant can lead to severe vomiting and seizures. Its purgative properties meant that it was traditionally used as a folk remedy to treat worms in children and topically to treat lice.

References

External links

viridis
Plants described in 1753
Taxa named by Carl Linnaeus
Flora of Central Europe
Flora of Northern Europe